The President of the University of Washington is the chief administrator of the university.

The University of Washington is a public university in Seattle, Washington. Established in 1861 and originally known as the Territorial University of Washington, UW is the oldest public university in the state of Washington. The University offers bachelor's, master's and doctoral degrees through its 140 departments, organized into various colleges and schools. With a total student enrollment of about 46,000, UW is one of the largest universities in the United States.

The longest-serving president of the university was William P. Gerberding, who held the office for sixteen years from 1979 to 1995.

The current president of the University of Washington is Ana Mari Cauce. Cauce served as the university's interim president before replacing the thirty-first president, Michael K. Young, and assuming her position as the university's permanent president on October 13, 2015. Cauce is the thirty-third president of the university. Twenty-five men and one woman have served as the university's permanent president, and six men and three women have served as its interim president pending the appointment of a permanent successor.

List of presidents 

The following individuals have held the Office of President of the University of Washington. There are gaps in the line of succession when the University was closed from 1867–1869 and part of 1874 and 1876 Acting university presidents are marked with an asterisk.

Timeline of University of Washington presidential terms

See also 
History of the University of Washington
List of University of Washington people
Washington Huskies

References 

Presidents of the University of Washington
Washington